The 2018 Atlantic 10 Conference men's soccer season was the 32nd season of varsity soccer in the conference. The regular season began on August 24 and concluded on November 11, 2018. Following the regular season, the 2018 Atlantic 10 Men's Soccer Tournament was held to determine the conference champion and automatic berth into the 2018 NCAA Division I Men's Soccer Tournament.

UMass enters the season as the defending regular season and tournament champions. The Minutemen finished eighth in the regular season and were eliminated in the quarterfinals of the A-10 Tournament by VCU. VCU won the regular season championship, giving the Rams their first A-10 regular season title, and their first regular season championship overall since 2004. Rhode Island won the tournament, given them their first A-10 tournament title since 2006.

Rhode Island at the A-10 Tournament champions, earned the conference's automatic berth into the NCAA Tournament. They were the only berth the A-10 sent to the NCAA Tournament. There they were defeated by their rivals, Connecticut, 3–4.

Preseason

Recruiting

Preseason poll 

The preseason poll will be released on August 21, 2018. Fordham was picked to win the regular season.

Preseason national polls 

Three of the programs were ranked in one of the five major preseason polls. CollegeSoccerNews.com and Hero Sports use a Top 30 ranking throughout the season, while United Soccer, Soccer America, and TopDrawer Soccer use a Top 25 ranking throughout the season.

Preseason All-Conference Team

Head coaches

Regular season 

All times Eastern time.† denotes Homecoming game

Week 1 (Aug. 20–26) 

Players of the week:

Week 2 (Aug. 27 – Sep. 2) 

Players of the week:

Week 3 (Sep. 3–9) 

Players of the week:

Week 4 (Sep. 10–16)  

Players of the week:

Week 5 (Sep. 17–23) 

Players of the week:

Week 6 (Sep. 24–30) 

Players of the week:

Week 7 (Oct. 1–7) 

Players of the week:

Week 8 (Oct. 8–14) 

Players of the week:

Week 9 (Oct. 15–21) 

Players of the week:

Week 10 (Oct. 22–28) 

Players of the week:

Week 11 (Oct. 29 – Nov. 4) 

Players of the week:

Rankings

United Soccer Coaches National

United Soccer Coaches Southeast Regional

Postseason

Atlantic 10 Tournament

NCAA Tournament

Awards

Postseason awards

All A-10 awards and teams

All Americans 

No players from the Atlantic 10 earned All-America honors.

MLS SuperDraft

Total picks by school

List of selections

Notable non-draft signees 
The following are notable players who went pro following the end of the season that were not selected in the 2018 MLS SuperDraft.

See also 
 2018 NCAA Division I men's soccer season
 2018 Atlantic 10 Men's Soccer Tournament
 2018 Atlantic 10 Conference women's soccer season

Notes 
The game between Saint Louis and Louisville was cancelled due to inclement weather.
The game between Gardner–Webb and George Mason was rescheduled from September 7 to September 8 due to lightning.
The game between Mount St. Mary's and George Mason has been postponed due to the rescheduled matches on September 7 to September 8.
The game between Coastal Carolina and George Mason has been postponed due to Hurricane Florence.

References

External links 
 Atlantic 10 Men's Soccer

 
2018 NCAA Division I men's soccer season